Benjamin Ronke (born 18 December 1997) is a professional Australian rules footballer playing for the Sydney Swans in the Australian Football League (AFL). He was drafted by Sydney with their first selection and seventeenth overall in the 2017 rookie draft. He made his debut in the seventeen point win against  at GMHBA Stadium kicking two goals in round six of the 2018 AFL season. In his third match, the Swans played against Hawthorn at the MCG, and Ronke became the first player to notch up seven goals and ten tackles in an AFL Match since the introduction of detailed statistics in the VFL/AFL in 1987. His performance in the match saw him earn the round 8 nomination for the 2018 AFL Rising Star.

Statistics
Updated to the end of the 2022 season.

|- 
| 2017 ||  || 25
| 0 || – || – || – || – || – || – || – || – || – || – || – || – || – || – || –
|- 
| 2018 ||  || 25
| 18 || 24 || 9 || 150 || 78 || 228 || 45 || 71 || 1.3 || 0.5 || 8.3 || 4.3 || 12.7 || 2.5 || 3.9 || 5
|-
| 2019 ||  || 25
| 13 || 9 || 8 || 86 || 49 || 135 || 36 || 28 || 0.7 || 0.6 || 6.6 || 3.8 || 10.4 || 2.8 || 2.2 || 0
|- 
| 2020 ||  || 25
| 3 || 0 || 0 || 19 || 10 || 29 || 6 || 11 || 0.0 || 0.0 || 6.3 || 3.3 || 9.7 || 2.0 || 3.7 || 0
|-
| 2021 ||  || 25
| 2 || 0 || 0 || 2 || 3 || 5 || 1 || 0 || 0.0 || 0.0 || 1.0 || 1.5 || 2.5 || 0.5 || 0.0 || 0
|- 
| 2022 ||  || 25
| 8 || 6 || 5 || 43 || 29 || 72 || 16 || 11 || 0.8 || 0.6 || 5.4 || 3.6 || 9.0 || 2.0 || 1.4 || 0
|- class=sortbottom
! colspan=3 | Career
! 44 !! 39 !! 22 !! 300 !! 169 !! 469 !! 104 !! 121 !! 0.9 !! 0.5 !! 6.8 !! 3.8 !! 10.7 !! 2.4 !! 2.8 !! 5
|}

Honours and achievements
Individual
 22under22 team: 2018
 AFL Rising Star nominee: 2018 (round 8)

References

External links

Living people
1997 births
Sydney Swans players
Calder Cannons players
Australian rules footballers from Victoria (Australia)